Charles Cozens Spencer (12 February 1874 – c. September 1930) was a British-born film exhibitor and producer, who was a significant figure in the early years of the Australian film industry. He produced films under the name Spencer's Pictures and was an early backer of the films of Raymond Longford. He was also instrumental in the creation of "The Combine".

Biography
Spencer was born in Hunston, Sussex, the third son of Cornelius Cosens, farmer, and his wife Ellen. In 1892 he emigrated to British Columbia, Canada, with his brother Arthur in order to look for gold. He did a variety of jobs then in 1894 formed a company of providers with his brother Sidney at Fairview and Camp McKinney. In 1898 he was a clerk at Vernon. He began screening motions pictures and met and married Mart Stuart Huntly who became his chief projectionist and business partner.

Australia
Spencer first arrived in Australia in 1905. He opened the Great American Theatrescope at the Lyceum Theatre in Sydney, which became a permanent picture theatre in June 1908.

He made a fortune exhibiting The Great Train Robbery in Australia and soon became the leading exhibitor in the country. He moved into production, establishing a permanent production unit under Ernest Higgins in 1908. Initially focused on documentary shorts and newsreels, he moved into funding dramatic feature films, starting with The Life and Adventures of John Vane, the Notorious Australian Bushranger (1910).

He was an early supporter of director Raymond Longford who directed The Fatal Wedding (1911) for Spencer. The success of this film enabled him to set up a £10,000 studio complex in Rushcutter's Bay, Sydney, where Longford made his next couple of features.

In 1911, Spencer had established a company, Spencer's Pictures Ltd with a nominal capital of £150,000. He went overseas for 12 months; while overseas, the board of Spencer's voted to merge with Wests Ltd and Amalgamated Pictures resulting in the "combine" of Australasian Films and Union Theatres.

By 1912, he was the largest importer of films in Australia and helped popularise the medium in that country. Several of his films were released in the US by Sawyers Pictures; they were given new titles such as The Convict Hero, The Bushranger's Bride, Nell Gwynne, The Bandit Terrors of Australia, and The Queen of the Smugglers.

After the box office failure of The Shepherd of the Southern Cross (1914), however, Spencer was unable to persuade the Combine to invest in drama production, and stepped back his involvement in the local industry.

In 1918, the Spencers were sued by the Combine for an alleged breach of contract. They settled out of court (by allowing their interests to be purchased) and left Australia.

Death
Spencer returned with his wife to Canada, where he bought several ranches in British Columbia in Chilcotin County. The stresses of his financial losses in the depression, however, affected his mental stability (in particular, he began being troubled by an image of the devil's face visible in the grain of a wooden wall).

On 10 September 1930, he was unpacking a truck full of groceries at one of his ranches along with his foreman, Walter Stoddart, and a grocer, Edward Smith. Spencer, probably delusional and paranoid, grabbed a gun and shot Smith in the back and then Stoddart, before fleeing. Smith died of his wounds; Stoddart managed to drive away and was rescued.

Spencer went missing in the aftermath of the shooting; eventually, on 29 October 1930, his body was found in a lake, where he had drowned himself. He left behind an estate worth $346,059.

Filmography
The Burns-Johnson Fight (1908)
Marvellous Melbourne (1910) – director
The Life and Adventures of John Vane, the Notorious Australian Bushranger (1910) – producer
Captain Midnight, the Bush King (1911) – producer
Captain Starlight, or Gentleman of the Road (1911) – producer
The Life of Rufus Dawes (1911) – producer
Dan Morgan (1911) – producer
The Fatal Wedding (1911) – producer
The Romantic Story of Margaret Catchpole (1911) – producer
Sweet Nell of Old Drury (1911) – producer
The Midnight Wedding (1912) – producer
The Bushman's Bride (1912) – producer
The Tide of Death (1912) – producer
Australia Calls (1913) – producer
The Shepherd of the Southern Cross (1914) – producer

Notes

References

Further reading

External links

Marvellous Melbourne at Australian Screen Online
Charles Cozens Spencer at National Film and Sound Archive
Full copy of Marvellous Melbourne at Internet Archive
Biography at Australian Dictionary of Biography

1900s in Australian cinema
1910s in Australian cinema
Film production companies of Australia
Australian film producers
1930 deaths
Suicides by drowning in Canada
1874 births